Silver Air was a charter airline based in Djibouti city, the capital of Djibouti. It ceased operations in 2009.

Fleet
As of 20 July 2009, the Silver Air fleet consisted of the following aircraft 20 July 2009:

2 Boeing 737-200
2 Boeing 737-300

References

External links
Silver Air Fleet

Defunct airlines of Djibouti
Airlines established in 2004
Airlines disestablished in 2009
2004 establishments in Djibouti
2009 disestablishments in Djibouti
Companies based in Djibouti (city)